Anthony John Arnerich (born December 14, 1979) is an American baseball coach for the Seattle Mariners of Major League Baseball.

A California native, Arnerich left the state after junior college to continue his education in Texas. After his junior year there, he contracted with the Kansas City Royals and played for minor league baseball teams in Iowa, Delaware, and Kansas from 2001 to 2004. Arnerich then joined the Florida Marlins and played minor league in North Carolina and Florida in 2004 and 2005.

Returning to California, Arnerich began coaching for college teams in 2006 and earned a bachelor's degree in 2008. He coached a collegiate summer team in Minnesota from 2007 to 2009. Arnerich joined the Mariners in 2014, and was designated a hitting coach for 2022.

Early education and minor league play
Arnerich graduated from Montgomery High School in Santa Rosa, California, in 1998. He attended Santa Rosa Junior College for two years and then transferred to Texas Tech University to play college baseball for the Texas Tech Red Raiders. After his junior season, he signed a free agent contract with the Kansas City Royals organization. In the summer seasons of 2001 and 2002, Arnerich played for the Burlington Bees.  In 2002 and 2003, he was with the Wilmington Blue Rocks, and in 2003 and 2004 it was the Wichita Wranglers. He played in the Florida Marlins organization before retiring as a player, with the Carolina Mudcats and Greensboro Bats in 2004, and the Jupiter Hammerheads in 2004 and 2005.

Coaching and degree
Arnerich became an assistant coach in 2006 at Sonoma State University, where he earned a Bachelor of Science degree in Sociology in 2008. He coached for the St. Cloud River Bats summer team from 2007 to 2009, and the California Golden Bears from 2007 to 2014, during which the team went to the College World Series in 2011. In 2014, he joined the Seattle Mariners organization, as a hitting and catching coordinator beginning in 2017. The Mariners promoted Arnerich to minor league field coordinator in 2020, and major league hitting coach for the 2022 season.

Personal life
Arnerich has coarctation of the aorta, a narrowing of the artery from the heart. He received a mechanical valve in 2012, but developed a staph infection near the device in 2013. In October 2013, his doctors said a second surgery to replace the valve was necessary, with only a 50/50 chance of his surviving it. A later CT scan showed the infection had cleared, however, and Arnerich returned to work in January 2014.

During a COVID-19 pandemic lockdown in spring 2020, Arnerich joined other Mariners players in posting video drills to encourage kids to continue in baseball activity. Arneric's fielding drill video included his young son and daughter.

References

External links

1979 births
Living people
Seattle Mariners coaches
Sportspeople from Santa Rosa, California
Santa Rosa Bear Cubs baseball players
Texas Tech Red Raiders baseball players
Sonoma State Seawolves baseball coaches
California Golden Bears baseball coaches
Major League Baseball hitting coaches
Burlington Bees players
Wilmington Blue Rocks players
Wichita Wranglers players
Greensboro Bats players
Jupiter Hammerheads players
Carolina Mudcats players
Sonoma State University alumni